Kanavihonnapura is a village in Dharwad district of Karnataka, India.

Demographics 
As of the 2011 Census of India there were 416 households in Kanavihonnapura and a total population of 2,044 consisting of 1,025 males and 1,019 females. There were 276 children ages 0-6.

References

Villages in Dharwad district